James Boyd Goodfellow (30 July 1938 – 1 April 2011) was a Scottish footballer who played for Third Lanark, Leicester City and Mansfield Town.

References

1938 births
Scottish footballers
Association football midfielders
English Football League players
Leicester City F.C. players
Mansfield Town F.C. players
2011 deaths
Third Lanark A.C. players
Scottish Football League players
Tranent Juniors F.C. players
Scottish Junior Football Association players
Footballers from Edinburgh
Scottish Football League representative players
Nuneaton Borough F.C. players
Durham City A.F.C. players
Leamington F.C. players
Weymouth F.C. players